Devin Lahardi Fitriawan (born 28 July 1983) is an Indonesian badminton player from the Tangkas Alfamart club. Born in Tasikmalaya, West Java, Fitriawan joined the national team in 2003. He was part of the Indonesia junior team that won the bronze medals at the 2001 Asian Junior Championships in the boys' doubles, mixed doubles, and boys' team event. In the senior event, Fitriawan plays in the mixed doubles event. Teamed-up with Lita Nurlita they won the title at the 2007 New Zealand Open and 2008 Chinese Taipei Open. He also won the 2010 Malaysia Grand Prix Gold partnered with Liliyana Natsir.

Fitriawan married general practitioner Fenny Novita Dewiand from Surabaya, East Java, on 10 October 2010.

Achievements

Asian Championships 
Mixed doubles

Asian Junior Championships 
Boys' doubles

Mixed doubles

BWF Grand Prix 
The BWF Grand Prix had two levels, the BWF Grand Prix and Grand Prix Gold. It was a series of badminton tournaments sanctioned by the Badminton World Federation (BWF) which was held from 2007 to 2017. The World Badminton Grand Prix sanctioned by International Badminton Federation (IBF) from 1983 to 2006.

Mixed doubles

  BWF Grand Prix Gold tournament
  BWF & IBF Grand Prix tournament

Performance timeline

National team 
 Junior level

 Senior level

Individual competitions 
 Junior level

 Senior level

References

External links 
 
 

1983 births
Living people
People from Tasikmalaya
Sportspeople from West Java
Indonesian male badminton players
Competitors at the 2009 Southeast Asian Games
Southeast Asian Games gold medalists for Indonesia
Southeast Asian Games medalists in badminton
21st-century Indonesian people